Casual Sex in the Cineplex is the debut album by The Sultans of Ping FC, recorded for Rhythm King and released in 1993.

Track listing
"Back in a Tracksuit"
"Indeed You Are"
"Veronica"
"2 Pints of Rasa"
"Stupid Kid"
"You Talk Too Much"
"Give Him a Ball (And a Yard of Grass)"
"Karaoke Queen"
"Let's Go Shopping"
"Kick Me with Your Leather Boots"
"Clitus Clarke"
"Where's Me Jumper?"

Personnel
 Niall O'Flaherty - vocals
 Pat O'Connell - guitar
 Alan McFeely - bass
 Morty McCarthy - drums

Chart Position

References

External links
 The Sultans Of Ping

1993 debut albums
The Sultans of Ping FC albums